Talisayan, officially the Municipality of Talisayan, is a 4th class municipality in the province of Misamis Oriental, Philippines. According to the 2020 census, it has a population of 25,761 people.

Geography

Barangays
Talisayan is politically subdivided into 18 barangays.

Climate

Demographics

Economy

References

External links
 [ Philippine Standard Geographic Code]
Philippine Census Information
Local Governance Performance Management System

Municipalities of Misamis Oriental